Thomas H. McTavish (January 12, 1943 – January 9, 2022) was the Michigan Auditor General from 1989 to 2014.

McTavish graduated from Gallitzin High School in 1960. He was senior class president.  He graduated from Pennsylvania State University with an accounting major and economics minor and is a lifetime member of the Penn State Alumni Association. McTavish served as a Navy Captain. McTavish previously served as the president of the National Association of State Auditors.

References

Michigan Auditors General
Pennsylvania State University alumni
Military personnel from Michigan
United States Navy captains
20th-century American politicians
21st-century American politicians